Dângeni is a commune in Botoșani County, Western Moldavia, Romania. It is composed of four villages: Dângeni, Hulub, Iacobeni and Strahotin.

Natives
 Gheorghe Berdar
 Petre Hârtopeanu

References

Communes in Botoșani County
Localities in Western Moldavia